Four ships of the Royal Navy have borne the name HMS Cheerful, after the adjective describing a happy and optimistic state:

, a 12-gun cutter, launched in 1806 and sold in 1816. 
, a wooden  launched at Deptford in 1856 and broken up in 1869. 
 a three funnel, 30-knot destroyer launched in 1897 and sunk in 1917 by a mine off the Shetland Islands.

References

Royal Navy ship names